SN, Sn, sn, .sn, or s.n. may refer to:

Businesses and organizations
Brussels Airlines (IATA code SN)
Sabena 
SN Brussels Airlines (IATA code SN)
Servant of the People (Sluha Narodu)
Slovaks Forward (Slovaci napred), a political party in Serbia
Standards Norway, the main standards organization of Norway
 (National Party), a Polish political party
Supreme Court of Poland (Sąd Najwyższy), the court of last resort for non-administrative matters

Places
Senegal (ISO country code SN)
Shaanxi, a province of China (Guobiao abbreviation SN)
South Sulawesi, a province of Indonesia (ISO 3166-2:ID code)
Saxony, a state of Germany
SN postcode area, the UK postcode district containing Swindon and much of North Wiltshire

Religion
Samyutta Nikaya or SN, a Buddhist scripture
Sutta Nipata or Sn, a Buddhist scripture

Science, technology, and mathematics

Computing
.sn, the country-code top level domain of Senegal
sn, the surname attribute of the Lightweight Directory Access Protocol

Mathematics
Symmetric group or Sn
n-sphere or Sn
sn (elliptic function), one of Jacobi's elliptic functions

Meteorology
SN, METAR code for snow
Spotter Network, a system for reporting location and severe weather observations of storm spotters and chasers

Other uses in science and technology
Savin–Norov machine gun
Space Network, a NASA relay satellite system
 Stereospecific numbering in compounds such as glycerophospholipids
Sthene, an obsolete unit of force or thrust in the metre-tonne-second system of units
Substantia nigra, a brain structure
Supernova, a stellar explosion, in astronomy and cosmology
Tin, symbol Sn, a chemical element

Other uses
 Seaman, abbreviation for the United States Navy rank
Serial number, in component tracking
Shona language (ISO 639 alpha-2 code "sn")
 or s.n., a Latin term for "without a name"
Spanish Navy
Abbreviation for Sportsnet, a Canadian sports specialty channel

See also 
S/n (disambiguation)
ΣΝ or Sigma Nu, a fraternity